The 2007–08 Toronto Raptors season was the 13th National Basketball Association (NBA) season for the Toronto Raptors basketball franchise, with the 2007–08 season scheduled to begin in October 2007. The major acquisition was that of three-point specialist Jason Kapono from the Miami Heat, and much expectations also rested on the maturing of Andrea Bargnani, Toronto's number one draft pick in 2006. With an overwhelming majority of home game sellouts (32, the second highest in franchise history), the Raptors qualified for the playoffs for the second year running, but this time around as the sixth seed. The Raptors faced the third seed Orlando Magic, and were eliminated in five games. The Raptors had the tenth best team offensive rating in the NBA.

Roster

Offseason

Coming off a successful 2006–07 campaign, Toronto were one of the league leaders in season ticket sales before the season began. Toronto was barred largely by salary cap from making any drastic changes to its starting lineup, but they remained active in transfer activity. The Raptors first acquired Georgios Printezis from the 2007 NBA draft, and followed up with a trade for Carlos Delfino, and the free agent signings of Jamario Moon, Maceo Baston and three-point specialist Jason Kapono. On the other hand, long-serving swingman Morris Peterson signed a four-year, $23-million US contract with the New Orleans Hornets, while Luke Jackson was waived. Toronto played seven pre-season exhibition games—including five games in a tour of Europe—and won five.

Regular season
The Raptors were once again led by captain and All-Star power forward Chris Bosh, while much hope was rested on the number one pick of the 2006 NBA draft, Andrea Bargnani, who was slated to start as center. Point guards T. J. Ford and José Calderón were to be deployed in tandem, Anthony Parker filled in the shooting guard position and Kapono featured as the starting small forward (Jorge Garbajosa was ruled out for the whole season seven games into the campaign). Initially, this lineup worked well enough as Toronto won its first two games of the campaign; in its second game against the New Jersey Nets, it set franchise records for biggest margin of victory in a road game, and fewest points conceded in a road game. However, the Raptors lost the next three games: Bosh and Bargnani could not seem to play well together, and Parker went through a bad shooting streak. This prompted coach Sam Mitchell to replace Bargnani with the veteran Radoslav Nesterović as the starting centre to give the team a greater defensive presence. Toronto rebounded immediately with a road victory against the Philadelphia 76ers, and the athletic Moon was also promoted to the starting team in the next game against the Chicago Bulls, and the Raptors scored the largest win against Bulls in franchise history.

Nevertheless, the Boston Celtics, who had acquired NBA All-Stars Kevin Garnett and Ray Allen before the season began, were setting the pace in the Atlantic Division and Eastern Conference as pundits had predicted (they would go on to record a league-best 66 wins in the regular season). Meanwhile, the Raptors struggled to maintain a .500 record. Moon was kept in the starting lineup for the most part and the rookie put up several good performances, while Calderón—who would lead the league with a 5.38 to 1 assist-to-turnover ratio by the season's end—was equally outstanding stepping in for Ford who had suffered a severe injury to his back. Delfino was a revelation as well, contributing on both ends of the court when he was first brought into the fold. Bargnani on the other hand did not perform as expected and apart from Bosh, the frontcourt often saw the rotation of the Italian, Nesterovič and Kris Humphries. Kapono, in the meantime, was seldom used to his full potential, either in terms of minutes played or shots attempted.

December was a particularly challenging period, with injuries to several key players, a long road trip and games against some of the best teams in the league. Toronto reached the mid-season mark with a 22–19 record and ranked as the best three-point shooting and second best free-throw shooting team in the NBA. It marked the start of its latter half of the season with a road win against Boston, and January proved to be the best month yet as Toronto capitalised on home advantage and went 8–5.

The 2008 NBA All-Star Weekend featured four Raptors: Bosh as the starting power forward for the East in the All-Star game, Bargnani and Moon for the Rookie/Sophomore Challenge, Moon for the Slam Dunk contest, and Kapono for the Three-Point Shootout. By this period, Bargnani and Bosh were beginning to combine more effectively, while Calderón continued to put in impressive performances regularly. Juan Dixon was traded to Detroit Pistons for Slovenian centre Primož Brezec before the trading deadline.

February and early March featured mostly opponents from the lower half of the league table, but Toronto had difficulties pulling away from the .500 mark, although the home win over the Knicks on 24 February 2008—their 54th game of the campaign—was the fastest Toronto ever reached the 30-win mark in a season. Nevertheless, the loss of Bosh for several games in the final third of the campaign sent the Raptors struggle even further; in a heavy 102–137 defeat to the Denver Nuggets on 14 March 2007, the team set a franchise record for most first-half points given up. With Boston dominating the division—and subsequently winning the title easily—Toronto's problems were exacerbated by Ford's increasing frustration at playing backup to Calderón, and there were even calls for Ford to be traded at the end of the season. Nesterovič was one of the few players who played well in Bosh's absence, but was unable to halt the team's slide.

The return of Bosh in late March served as a minor reprieve, but the Raptors continued to capitulate in spectacular fashion in their remaining games, plummeting down the conference rankings with defeat after defeat, and fans were beginning to show their displeasure. In response, Bosh made a video on YouTube, urging the fans to rally behind the team as the playoffs were arriving. The Raptors went on to close out the season with a 41–41 record, qualifying for the 2008 NBA Playoffs as the sixth seed and setting up themselves with a matchup against the Orlando Magic. While ending the season as the league's best three-point shooting team (0.390) and the team with the least turnovers (13.1 per 100 possessions), the Raptors continued to be criticised for being defensively poor on the perimeter, and playing without enough aggression.

Season standings

Game log 

|- bgcolor="bbffbb"
| 1
| October 31
| Philadelphia
| 
| Andrea Bargnani (20)
| Carlos Delfino, Anthony Parker (6)
| T. J. Ford (12)
| Air Canada Centre19,800
| 1–0

|- bgcolor="#bbffbb"
| 2
| November 2
| @ New Jersey
| 
| Andrea Bargnani (21)
| Andrea Bargnani, Carlos Delfino (6)
| José Calderón (8)
| Izod Center14,980
| 2–0
|- bgcolor="#ffcccc"
| 3
| November 4
| Boston
| 
| T. J. Ford (32)
| Chris Bosh (10)
| T. J. Ford (5)
| Air Canada Centre19,800
| 2–1
|- bgcolor="#ffcccc"
| 4
| November 6
| @ Milwaukee
| 
| Juan Dixon (20)
| Kris Humphries (9)
| José Calderón (8)
| Bradley Center13,495
| 2–2
|- bgcolor="#ffcccc"
| 5
| November 7
| Orlando
| 
| Chris Bosh (26)
| Chris Bosh (10)
| T. J. Ford (8)
| Air Canada Centre17,977
| 2–3
|- bgcolor="#bbffbb"
| 6
| November 9
| @ Philadelphia
| 
| Chris Bosh (24)
| Chris Bosh (10)
| José Calderón (7)
| Wachovia Center10,886
| 3–3
|- bgcolor="#bbffbb"
| 7
| November 10
| @ Chicago
| 
| Carlos Delfino (16)
| Radoslav Nesterović (8)
| T. J. Ford (14)
| United Center22,467
| 4–3
|- bgcolor="#ffcccc"
| 8
| November 14
| Utah
| 
| Anthony Parker (19)
| Kris Humphries (14)
| T. J. Ford (8)
| Air Canada Centre17,337
| 4–4
|- bgcolor="#bbffbb"
| 9
| November 16
| Indiana
| 
| Chris Bosh (22)
| Jamario Moon (7)
| José Calderón (10)
| Air Canada Centre19,800
| 5–4
|- bgcolor="#ffcccc"
| 10
| November 18
| Golden State
| 
| T. J. Ford (29)
| Chris Bosh (11)
| T. J. Ford (9)
| Air Canada Centre19,800
| 5–5
|- bgcolor="#ffcccc"
| 11
| November 20
| @ Dallas
| 
| Chris Bosh (31)
| Chris Bosh, Jamario Moon (12)
| José Calderón (6)
| American Airlines Center20,272
| 5–6
|- bgcolor="#bbffbb"
| 12
| November 21
| @ Memphis
| 
| Chris Bosh (22)
| Chris Bosh (19)
| José Calderón (8)
| FedExForum12,217
| 6–6
|- bgcolor="#ffcccc"
| 13
| November 24
| @ Cleveland
| 
| Chris Bosh (41)
| Anthony Parker (7)
| José Calderón (13)
| Quicken Loans Arena20,018
| 6–7
|- bgcolor="#bbffbb"
| 14
| November 25
| Chicago
| 
| José Calderón (19)
| Chris Bosh (13)
| José Calderón (14)
| Air Canada Centre19,800
| 7–7
|- bgcolor="#bbffbb"
| 15
| November 28
| Memphis
| 
| Anthony Parker (19)
| Jamario Moon, Anthony Parker (8)
| José Calderón (10)
| Air Canada Centre18,906
| 8–7
|- bgcolor="#bbffbb"
| 16
| November 30
| Cleveland
| 
| Andrea Bargnani (26)
| Jamario Moon, Radoslav Nesterović (9)
| José Calderón (10)
| Air Canada Centre19,800
| 9–7

|- bgcolor="#ffcccc"
| 17
| December 1
| @ Washington
| 
| Jason Kapono (23)
| Jamario Moon (13)
| José Calderón (11)
| Verizon Center20,173
| 9–8
|- bgcolor="#bbffbb"
| 18
| December 3
| Charlotte
| 
| Carlos Delfino, Kris Humphries (17)
| Jamario Moon (12)
| José Calderón (9)
| Air Canada Centre17,439
| 10–8
|- bgcolor="#ffcccc"
| 19
| December 5
| Phoenix
| 
| T. J. Ford (27)
| Jamario Moon (10)
| José Calderón (9)
| Air Canada Centre19,800
| 10–9
|- bgcolor="#ffcccc"
| 20
| December 7
| @ Boston
| 
| Anthony Parker (13)
| Joey Graham (6)
| Carlos Delfino, Darrick Martin (4)
| TD Banknorth Garden18,624
| 10–10
|- bgcolor="#bbffbb"
| 21
| December 9
| Houston
| 
| Chris Bosh (21)
| Chris Bosh (10)
| José Calderón (6)
| Air Canada Centre19,800
| 11–10
|- bgcolor="#bbffbb"
| 22
| December 11
| @ Atlanta
| 
| T. J. Ford (26)
| Chris Bosh (13)
| T. J. Ford (8)
| Philips Arena13,173
| 12–10
|- bgcolor="#bbffbb"
| 23
| December 12
| Dallas
| 
| Chris Bosh (17)
| Kris Humphries (12)
| José Calderón (7)
| Air Canada Centre19,800
| 13–10
|- bgcolor="#bbffbb"
| 24
| December 14
| @ Indiana
| 
| Jason Kapono (29)
| Chris Bosh (16)
| José Calderón (16)
| Conseco Fieldhouse10,437
| 14–10
|- bgcolor="#ffcccc"
| 25
| December 16
| Boston
| 
| Chris Bosh (17)
| Chris Bosh (13)
| Chris Bosh, José Calderón (5)
| Air Canada Centre19,800
| 14–11
|- bgcolor="#bbffbb"
| 26
| December 18
| @ L.A. Clippers
| 
| Chris Bosh (24)
| Chris Bosh (9)
| José Calderón (9)
| Staples Center14,455
| 15–11
|- bgcolor="#ffcccc"
| 27
| December 19
| @ Portland
| 
| José Calderón (19)
| Chris Bosh (11)
| José Calderón (9)
| Rose Garden Arena16,066
| 15–12
|- bgcolor="#ffcccc"
| 28
| December 21
| @ Seattle
| 
| Chris Bosh (26)
| Chris Bosh (13)
| José Calderón (16)
| KeyArena13,661
| 15–13
|- bgcolor="#ffcccc"
| 29
| December 22
| @ Phoenix
| 
| Chris Bosh (42)
| Chris Bosh (13)
| José Calderón, Juan Dixon (4)
| US Airways Center18,422
| 15–14
|- bgcolor="#bbffbb"
| 30
| December 28
| @ San Antonio
| 
| Jason Kapono (15)
| Kris Humphries (11)
| José Calderón (5)
| AT&T Center18,797
| 16–14
|- bgcolor="#ffcccc"
| 31
| December 29
| @ Houston
| 
| Chris Bosh (19)
| Chris Bosh (12)
| José Calderón (10)
| Toyota Center18,103
| 16–15
|- bgcolor="#bbffbb"
| 32
| December 31
| @ New Orleans
| 
| Chris Bosh (29)
| Jamario Moon (10)
| José Calderón (12)
| New Orleans Arena11,444
| 17–15

|- bgcolor="#ffcccc"
| 33
| January 4
| Detroit
| 
| Andrea Bargnani (25)
| Chris Bosh (16)
| José Calderón (9)
| Air Canada Centre19,800
| 17–16
|- bgcolor="#ffcccc"
| 34
| January 6
| Cleveland
| 
| Chris Bosh (23)
| Anthony Parker (9)
| José Calderón (11)
| Air Canada Centre19,800
| 17–17
|- bgcolor="#bbffbb"
| 35
| January 9
| Philadelphia
| 
| Anthony Parker (22)
| Jamario Moon (9)
| José Calderón (9)
| Air Canada Centre18,067
| 18–17
|- bgcolor="#bbffbb"
| 36
| January 11
| @ New York
| 
| Chris Bosh (40)
| Chris Bosh (11)
| José Calderón (8)
| Madison Square Garden17,456
| 19–17
|- bgcolor="#bbffbb"
| 37
| January 13
| Portland
| 
| Chris Bosh (38)
| Chris Bosh (14)
| José Calderón (10)
| Air Canada Centre19,800
| 20–17
|- bgcolor="#ffcccc"
| 38
| January 15
| @ Detroit
| 
| Chris Bosh (16)
| Chris Bosh (11)
| José Calderón (5)
| The Palace of Auburn Hills22,076
| 20–18
|- bgcolor="#bbffbb"
| 39
| January 16
| Sacramento
| 
| Chris Bosh (31)
| Chris Bosh (9)
| José Calderón (14)
| Air Canada Centre17,760
| 21–18
|- bgcolor="#bbffbb"
| 40
| January 18
| Atlanta
| 
| Chris Bosh (35)
| Chris Bosh (9)
| José Calderón (9)
| Air Canada Centre19,800
| 22–18
|- bgcolor="#ffcccc"
| 41
| January 19
| @ Philadelphia
| 
| Chris Bosh (25)
| Chris Bosh, Jamario Moon (9)
| José Calderón (11)
| Wachovia Center13,853
| 22–19
|- bgcolor="#bbffbb"
| 42
|  January 23
| @ Boston
| 
| José Calderón (24)
| Andrea Bargnani, Chris Bosh (7)
| José Calderón (13)
| TD Banknorth Garden18,624
| 23–19
|- bgcolor="#bbffbb"
| 43
| January 25
| Milwaukee
| 
| Chris Bosh (32)
| Andrea Bargnani, Chris Bosh (7)
| José Calderón (12)
| Air Canada Centre19,800
| 24–19
|- bgcolor="#ffcccc"
| 44
| January 29
| @ Washington
| 
| Chris Bosh (37)
| Chris Bosh (12)
| José Calderón (13)
| Verizon Center12,905
| 24–20
|- bgcolor="#bbffbb"
| 45
| January 30
| Washington
| 
| Andrea Bargnani (19)
| Radoslav Nesterović (8)
| José Calderón (11)
| Air Canada Centre19,800
| 25–20

|- bgcolor="#ffcccc"
| 46
| February 1
| L.A. Lakers
| 
| Andrea Bargnani (28)
| Chris Bosh (15)
| Juan Dixon (6)
| Air Canada Centre19,800
| 25–21
|- bgcolor="#bbffbb"
| 47
| February 4
| @ Miami
| 
| Chris Bosh (24)
| Jamario Moon (9)
| José Calderón (10)
| American Airlines Arena19,600
| 26–21
|- bgcolor="#ffcccc"
| 48
| February 8
| L.A. Clippers
| 
| Chris Bosh (29)
| Chris Bosh (12)
| José Calderón (14)
| Air Canada Centre19,800
| 26–22
|- bgcolor="#bbffbb"
| 49
| February 10
| @ Minnesota
| 
| Andrea Bargnani (16)
| Chris Bosh, Carlos Delfino (9)
| T. J. Ford (13)
| Target Center13,785
| 27–22
|- bgcolor="#ffcccc"
| 50
| February 11
| San Antonio
| 
| José Calderón (27)
| Chris Bosh, Carlos Delfino, Jamario Moon (8)
| José Calderón (6)
| Air Canada Centre19,800
| 27–23
|- bgcolor="#bbffbb"
| 51
| February 13
| New Jersey
| 
| Chris Bosh (27)
| Chris Bosh, Carlos Delfino (9)
| José Calderón (12)
| Air Canada Centre19,800
| 28–23
|- bgcolor="#bbffbb"
| 52
| February 20
| Orlando
| 
| Chris Bosh (40)
| Jamario Moon (12)
| José Calderón (13)
| Air Canada Centre19,800
| 29–23
|- bgcolor="#ffcccc"
| 53
| February 22
| @ New York
| 
| Chris Bosh (23)
| Chris Bosh, Jamario Moon (8)
| José Calderón (6)
| Madison Square Garden19,763
| 29–24
|- bgcolor="#bbffbb"
| 54
| February 24
| New York
| 
| Andrea Bargnani (25)
| Jamario Moon, Radoslav Nesterović (8)
| José Calderón (7)
| Air Canada Centre19,800
| 30–24
|- bgcolor="#bbffbb"
| 55
| February 25
| @ Indiana
| 
| Chris Bosh (24)
| Anthony Parker (11)
| T. J. Ford (7)
| Conseco Fieldhouse10,468
| 31–24
|- bgcolor="#bbffbb"
| 56
| February 27
| Minnesota
| 
| Chris Bosh (28)
| Chris Bosh, Jamario Moon (7)
| José Calderón (7)
| Air Canada Centre18,325
| 32–24
|- bgcolor="#ffcccc"
| 57
| February 29
| Indiana
| 
| Andrea Bargnani (27)
| Andrea Bargnani (9)
| José Calderón (11)
| Air Canada Centre19,800
| 32–25

|- bgcolor="#ffcccc"
| 58
| March 2
| @ Charlotte
| 
| Anthony Parker (24)
| Kris Humphries, Anthony Parker (6)
| José Calderón (10)
| Charlotte Bobcats Arena12,083
| 32–26
|- bgcolor="#ffcccc"
| 59
| March 4
| @ Orlando
| 
| T. J. Ford (20)
| Carlos Delfino, Anthony Parker (9)
| José Calderón, Carlos Delfino (3)
| Amway Arena17,519
| 32–27
|- bgcolor="#bbffbb"
| 60
| March 5
| @ Miami
| 
| Radoslav Nesterović (16)
| Radoslav Nesterović (10)
| José Calderón (13)
| American Airlines Arena19,143
| 33–27
|- bgcolor="#ffcccc"
| 61
| March 7
| Washington
| 
| Andrea Bargnani (27)
| Radoslav Nesterović (12)
| José Calderón (9)
| Air Canada Centre19,800
| 33–28
|- bgcolor="#bbffbb"
| 62
| March 9
| Seattle
| 
| Anthony Parker (23)
| Andrea Bargnani (7)
| Radoslav Nesterović (6)
| Air Canada Centre19,800
| 34–28
|- bgcolor="#ffcccc"
| 63
| March 11
| @ L.A. Lakers
| 
| T. J. Ford (28)
| Radoslav Nesterović (8)
| Andrea Bargnani, José Calderón (6)
| Staples Center18,997
| 34–29
|- bgcolor="#ffcccc"
| 64
| March 12
| @ Golden State
| 
| T. J. Ford (23)
| Anthony Parker (9)
| T. J. Ford (8)
| Oracle Arena19,596
| 34–30
|- bgcolor="#ffcccc"
| 65
| March 14
| @ Denver
| 
| Anthony Parker (19)
| Carlos Delfino, Jamario Moon (7)
| José Calderón (7)
| Pepsi Center17,952
| 34–31
|- bgcolor="#ffcccc"
| 66
| March 16
| @ Sacramento
| 
| Jason Kapono (26)
| Radoslav Nesterović (8)
| José Calderón (9)
| ARCO Arena13,963
| 34–32
|- bgcolor="#ffcccc"
| 67
| March 17
| @ Utah
| 
| José Calderón (16)
| Radoslav Nesterović (12)
| José Calderón (7)
| EnergySolutions Arena19,911
| 34–33
|- bgcolor="#bbffbb"
| 68
| March 19
| Miami
| 
| Andrea Bargnani, Anthony Parker (14)
| Jamario Moon (14)
| José Calderón (10)
| Air Canada Centre19,800
| 35–33
|- bgcolor="#ffcccc"
| 69
| March 21
| @ Cleveland
| 
| Chris Bosh (24)
| Jamario Moon (10)
| T. J. Ford (5)
| Quicken Loans Arena20,562
| 35–34
|- bgcolor="#ffcccc"
| 70
| March 23 || Denver
| 
| Chris Bosh, José Calderón (17)
| Jamario Moon (15)
| Chris Bosh (9)
| Air Canada Centre19,800
| 35–35
|- bgcolor="#bbffbb"
| 71
| March 26
| Detroit
| 
| Chris Bosh (21)
| Radoslav Nesterović (9)
| T. J. Ford (9)
| Air Canada Centre19,800
| 36–35
|- bgcolor="#bbffbb"
| 72
| March 28
| New York
| 
| Chris Bosh (29)
| Chris Bosh, Carlos Delfino (10)
| T. J. Ford (9)
| Air Canada Centre19,800
| 37–35
|- bgcolor="#ffcccc"
| 73
| March 30
| New Orleans
| 
| Chris Bosh (21)
| Chris Bosh, Kris Humphries (7)
| José Calderón (11)
| Air Canada Centre19,800
| 37–36
|- bgcolor="#bbffbb"
| 74
| March 31
| @ Charlotte
| 
| Chris Bosh (32)
| Radoslav Nesterović (11)
| T. J. Ford (7)
| Charlotte Bobcats Arena12,188
| 38–36

|- bgcolor="#ffcccc"
| 75
| April 2
| @ Atlanta
| 
| Chris Bosh (24)
| Carlos Delfino (11)
| T. J. Ford (13)
| Philips Arena14,691
| 38–37
|- bgcolor="#ffcccc"
| 76
| April 4
| Charlotte
| 
| Chris Bosh, Radoslav Nesterović (23)
| Radoslav Nesterović (10)
| T. J. Ford (14)
| Air Canada Centre19,800
| 38–38
|- bgcolor="#ffcccc"
| 77
| April 5
| @ New Jersey
| 
| Radoslav Nesterović (22)
| Radoslav Nesterović (14)
| Chris Bosh (6)
| Izod Center15,927
| 38–39
|- bgcolor="#bbffbb"
| 78
| April 9
| Milwaukee
| 
| Chris Bosh (32)
| Chris Bosh (11)
| José Calderón (12)
| Air Canada Centre18,569
| 39–39
|- bgcolor="#bbffbb"
| 79
| April 11
| New Jersey
| 
| Carlos Delfino (24)
| Chris Bosh (9)
| José Calderón (10)
| Air Canada Centre19,800
| 40–39
|- bgcolor="#ffcccc"
| 80
| April 13
| @ Detroit
| 
| Chris Bosh (30)
| Chris Bosh (10)
| T. J. Ford (8)
| The Palace of Auburn Hills22,076
| 40–40
|- bgcolor="#bbffbb"
| 81
| April 14
| Miami
| 
| Radoslav Nesterović (20)
| Andrea Bargnani, Radoslav Nesterović, Anthony Parker (7)
| José Calderón (11)
| Air Canada Centre18,855
| 41–40
|- bgcolor="#ffcccc"
| 82
| April 16
| @ Chicago
| 
| T. J. Ford (18)
| Kris Humphries (7)
| José Calderón (8)
| United Center21,909
| 41–41

Playoffs

The first-round series against the Magic was touted as the matchup between two of the league's best young big men in Dwight Howard and Bosh, but the Raptors were perceived to have an advantage in their dual-point guard play. With Orlando holding home court advantage, however, the Raptors were unable to win their first two road games. In Game 1, Bargnani was deployed as the starting small forward (with Nesterovič moved to the bench) but this did not pay dividends. Orlando took a huge lead in the first quarter with nine three-pointers converted and with Howard dominating the game, Toronto were unable to cut back on the deficit. Game 2 was the same with Orlando opening up the first quarter with a big lead and Howard dominating yet again, but solid plays from Bosh, Kapono and Calderón saw the Raptors take the lead with just a couple of minutes remaining in the game. With 9 seconds left on the clock, Bosh had a chance to score the game-winning basket but his 18-foot jumper missed the mark.

Coach Mitchell promised yet another change in the starting lineup for Game 3 at Toronto (with Moon replacing Nesterovič), and this time the Magic were unable to dominate the first quarter as before. With Ford leading Toronto in scoring and Calderón stepping up his game yet again, the Raptors preserved some hope with a 108–94 home win. Only one point separated both teams leading up to the fourth quarter in Game 4, and despite Bosh recording 39 points and 15 rebounds, deadly shooting by the Magic in the final few minutes ensured victory for the visitors. Back on the road in Game 5, Toronto were outplayed by the Magic in the second half, and were thus eliminated from the first round four games to one. GM Bryan Colangelo said at a press conference thereafter, "Whether it's protecting [Bosh] inside the paint, getting a little bit more of a presence in there, to just getting him another scorer that's going to shoulder some of that burden, it's something that's clear we have to get better", hinting that changes to the squad beckoned for the next season. Throughout the series, Orlando's point guard Jameer Nelson capitalised on being left unguarded and shot 51.9% from the three-point arc, while Howard single-handedly outrebounded the entire Toronto frontcourt with 91 rebounds.

Playoffs

|- bgcolor="#ffcccc"
| 1
| April 20
| @ Orlando
| 
| Anthony Parker (24)
| Radoslav Nesterović (8)
| José Calderón (8)
| Amway Arena17,519
| 0–1
|- bgcolor="#ffcccc"
| 2
| April 22
| @ Orlando
| 
| Chris Bosh (29)
| Chris Bosh (10)
| Chris Bosh, T. J. Ford (6)
| Amway Arena17,519
| 0–2
|- bgcolor="#bbffbb"
| 3
| April 24
| Orlando
| 
| T. J. Ford (21)
| Jamario Moon (10)
| José Calderón (13)
|Air Canada Centre 20,023
| 1–2
|- bgcolor="#ffcccc"
| 4
| April 26
| Orlando
| 
| Chris Bosh (39)
| Chris Bosh (15)
| T. J. Ford (13)
| Air Canada Centre20,416
| 1–3
|- bgcolor="#ffcccc"
| 5
| April 28
| @ Orlando
| 
| Chris Bosh (16)
| Chris Bosh (9)
| T. J. Ford (5)
| Amway Arena 17,519
| 1–4

Player statistics

Regular season

*Total for entire season including previous team(s)

Playoffs

References

External links
 2007–08 Toronto Raptors season at Basketball Reference
 2007–08 Toronto Raptors season at Database Basketball

Toronto Raptors seasons
Toronto
Tor